Wan Shuk Kwan is a former international table tennis player from Hong Kong.

Table tennis career
She won a bronze medal for Hong Kong at the 1995 World Table Tennis Championships in the Corbillon Cup (women's team event) with Chai Po Wa, Chan Tan Lui and Tong Wun.

See also
 List of World Table Tennis Championships medalists

References

Hong Kong female table tennis players
World Table Tennis Championships medalists
Living people
Year of birth missing (living people)
20th-century Hong Kong women